The Vennerbrunnen (Banner Carrier or Vexillum Fountain) is a fountain on Rathausplatz in the Old City of Bern, Switzerland.  It is a Swiss Cultural Property of National Significance and is part of the UNESCO World Heritage Site of the Old City of Bern.

History
The fountain is located in front of the old city hall or Rathaus. The Venner was military-political title in medieval Switzerland. He was responsible for peace and protection in a section of a city and then to lead troops from that section in battle. In Bern the Venner was a very powerful position and was key in city's operations. Each Venner was connected to a guild and chosen from the guild. Venner was one of only two positions from which the Schultheiß or Lord Mayor was chosen. The statue, built in 1542 shows a Venner in full armor with his banner.

References

External links
 

Fountains in Bern